Sandbotnen Cirque is a cirque or small valley, the floor of which is covered by moraine, indenting the west side of Zwiesel Mountain in the Pieck Range, Wohlthat Mountains. First plotted from air photos by German Antarctic Expedition, 1938–39. Replotted from air photos and surveys by Norwegian Antarctic Expedition, 1956–60, and named Sandbotnen (the sand cirque).

References

External links

Cirques of Queen Maud Land
Princess Astrid Coast